Hello, Dolly! is the soundtrack album to the 1969 musical film of the same name, performed by Barbra Streisand, Walter Matthau, and Michael Crawford. Originally released on vinyl by 20th Century Fox Records, the soundtrack was remastered for compact disc release by Philips Records in 1994.  This album marked the second time Streisand recorded for a label other than Columbia (the previous instance being the Original Broadway Cast recording of Funny Girl five years earlier).

Artwork
The poster on the album cover was created by Richard Amsel, a 22-year-old student winner of a nationwide contest to design the film.

Track listing
All songs written by Jerry Herman
 "Just Leave Everything To Me" (sung by Barbra Streisand) – 3:24
 "It Takes A Woman" (sung by Walter Matthau) – 3:06
 "It Takes A Woman (Reprise)" (sung by Barbra Streisand) – 2:16
 "Put On Your Sunday Clothes" (sung by Company and Barbra Streisand and Michael Crawford) – 5:32
 "Ribbons Down My Back" (sung by Melissa Stafford, dubbing for Marianne McAndrew) – 2:30 
 "Dancing" (sung by Barbra Streisand and Michael Crawford)" – 3:30
 "Before The Parade Passes By" (sung by Barbra Streisand)" – 4:54
 "Elegance" (sung by Company and Michael Crawford) – 3:07
 "Love Is Only Love" (sung by Barbra Streisand) – 3:12
 "Hello, Dolly!" (sung by Barbra Streisand and Louis Armstrong and ensemble) – 7:51
 "It Only Takes A Moment" (sung by Michael Crawford) – 4:11
 "So Long Dearie" (sung by Barbra Streisand) – 2:40
 "Finale" (sung by Company, Walter Matthau, Michael Crawford and Barbra Streisand) – 4:19

Chart positions

References

External links 
 

Barbra Streisand soundtracks
1969 soundtrack albums
20th Century Fox Records soundtracks
Comedy film soundtracks
Musical film soundtracks
Romance film soundtracks